{{DISPLAYTITLE:C18H27NO3}}
The molecular formula C18H27NO3 (molar mass : 305.41 g/mol) may refer to :
 Capsaicin, the active component of chili peppers
 Droxypropine
 Prosidol
 Zucapsaicin